Thom Christopher (born October 5, 1940) is an American actor.

Christopher attended Ithaca College and studied acting at the Neighborhood Playhouse.

He is best known for his portrayal of Hawk, a half-man, half-bird warrior in the second season of Buck Rogers in the 25th Century in 1981. He also played an upstate Pennsylvania mob boss Carlo Hesser (1990–1992, 1996–1997, 2005, 2006, 2008) and his meek twin Mortimer Bern (1992–1993, 1997) on the ABC soap opera, One Life to Live.

Christopher has also had roles on soap operas such as Loving and Guiding Light. He created the role of Noel Douglas on the CBS soap opera The Edge of Night.

Filmography
 2003 Nola as Niles Sterling
 1988 Deathstalker and the Warriors from Hell as Troxartas (V)
 1985 Wizards of the Lost Kingdom as Shurka
 1983 Space Raiders as "Flightplan"
 1980 S*H*E as Eddie Bronzi

Television
 1974 The Edge of Night as Noel Douglas #1
 1975 Cannon, episode "The Hero"
 1978 The Eddie Capra Mysteries, episode "The Two-Million-Dollar Stowaway"
 1981 Buck Rogers in the 25th Century as "Hawk"
 1983 Simon & Simon - "All Your Favourite Games" as Sid Castle - S03 E12
 1987-1989 Murder, She Wrote - "Trouble in Eden" as Reverend Willard Manchester and "Appointment in Athens" as Dimitri Popadopalous 
 1990-2008 One Life to Live as Carlo Hesser / Mortimer Bern
 1999 Cyberchase, episode "Pilot/The Poddleville Case"
 1984 T. J. Hooker - "Too Late for Love" as Harry Cort and "Death Strip" as Paul Gavin
 2000-2004 Law & Order- "Stiff" as Dr. Bertram Stokes and "Caviar Emptor" as Alferandi Dilmanian
 1993-1994 Loving as Dante Partou / Joe Young
 1999-2002 Guiding Light as Colonel Dax

Awards (won)
(1973-1974) Theatre World Award for Noel Coward in Two Keys
(1992) Daytime Emmy Outstanding Supporting Actor in a Drama Series for One Life to Live

Awards (nominated)
Daytime Emmy Awards

(1994) Daytime Emmy Outstanding Supporting Actor in a Drama Series for Loving
(1993) Daytime Emmy Outstanding Supporting Actor in a Drama Series for One Life to Live

Soap Opera Digest Awards

(1993) Soap Opera Digest Award Outstanding Supporting Actor for One Life to Live
(1992) Soap Opera Digest Award Outstanding Villain: Daytime for One Life to Live

References

External links

1940 births
Living people
American male stage actors
American male film actors
American male television actors
American male soap opera actors
Daytime Emmy Award winners
Daytime Emmy Award for Outstanding Supporting Actor in a Drama Series winners
Male actors from New York (state)
People from Jackson Heights, Queens
Ithaca College alumni